K251BS (98.1 FM) is a translator radio station licensed to North Las Vegas, Nevada.  The Station is owned through licensee Latino Hustle Group LLC. The station carries a hybrid Regional Mexican and Reggaeton format known as "Fiesta".

"Fiesta" format history
On May 30, 2020, the station changed frequencies from 87.7 MHz to 98.1 MHz, and rebranded as "Fiesta 98.1 FM". Its current Program Director is Rogelio "El Torito" Regalado. On 2021 they launched as an first sir date. Most of its on air staff also doubles as sales staff. The station is relayed through a third HD sub-channel of KLUC-FM.

In addition to terrestrial FM radio, "Fiesta" broadcasts through their website fiestaradiolasvegas.com, and the Audacy, Uforia, TuneIn and iHeartRadio mobile applications.

Fiesta Las Vegas listeners now have direct access to talents such as Don Cheto, El Zirko, El Torito, La Madrina and many local community leaders and journalists that are making a difference in Las Vegas.

References

Radio stations in Las Vegas
Regional Mexican radio stations in the United States
Reggaeton radio stations